Baia e Latina is a comune (municipality) in the Province of Caserta in the Italian region Campania, located about  north of Naples and about  northwest of Caserta.

The town hall is located in the locality called Baia, Latina is a former hamlet now part of the inhabited center; therefore it is not a scattered municipality.  
 
Baia Latina borders the following municipalities: Alife, Dragoni, Pietravairano, Roccaromana, Sant'Angelo d'Alife. It was once formed by two separate settlements, Baia and Latina, but over time the two merged.

History
The origins of Baia Latina are uncertain and, historically, its name appears in 979 in the bull of Santo Stefano di Caiazzo.According to Marciano Rossi, the ancient (Baia) was an Etruscan colony, a hypothesis perhaps confirmed by the discovery of amphorae, depicted in the Latin Goddess.
Latina was, on the other hand, a colony because of the Vayardis settled there.

Monuments and places of interest
 Church of San Vito martire: of eighteenth-century origin, it has undergone numerous restorations over the years that have progressively distorted its original appearance.
 Church of Santo Stefano: the church has a modern structure built at the end of 1900.

 Scotti Palace
 Church of the Madonna delle Grazie
 Church of San Lorenzo
 Church of the Annunciation: the church overlooks the SP 289 and is easily recognizable by the monumental access staircase and by its apparently simple appearance.
 Church of Santa Maria Assunta
 Ponte dell'Inferno (or dell'Oloferne) Roman bridge of the Via Latina, over the Volturno river
 Medieval village with Norman castle and towers

Economy
The economy is based on agriculture (cereals, fodder, vegetables, grapes), on breeding (mainly cattle and buffaloes) with the production of milk and derivatives. In the area the Terre del Volturno wines are produced in the white, red and rosé varieties.

References

External links

 

Cities and towns in Campania